"Freeze-Frame" is a song written by Seth Justman and Peter Wolf for the J. Geils Band. It was first released as the opening track on the chart-topping 1981 album of the same name. The song was released on a 45 in early 1982 as the second single from the album, following the million-selling US #1/UK #3 hit "Centerfold". The single's flip side, "Flamethrower", received airplay on urban contemporary radio stations throughout the United States, and reached #20 on the Billboard Soul Chart.

Reception
Billboard called it a "zesty, exuberant rocker" and praised the song's hooks.  Record World said that "Seth Justman's bouncy keyboard melodies and the slap-happy beat back Peter Wolf's lively lead vocal."

Ultimate Classic Rock critic Michael Gallucci rated "Freeze-Frame" to be the band's 7th greatest song, saying that it has "a glossy pop sheen ready-made for Top 40 radio."

Chart performance
"Centerfold" had landed the band at the top of the Billboard Hot 100 for 6 weeks in early 1982 and would ultimately give them a UK top 3 hit almost a year later. "Freeze-Frame" was chosen as the second single and at the peak of the band's popularity, became the second consecutive million-selling gold-certified hit from the album, ultimately peaking at #4 on the Hot 100 on April 10, 1982 and remained in that position for 4 weeks, after entering the charts in mid-February. The single also reached #27 in the UK.

"Centerfold" and "Freeze-Frame" are among a total of ten singles by the J. Geils Band to reach the Billboard Top 40.

Charts

Weekly charts

Year-end charts

B-side

Most versions of the single released domestically and internationally used "Flamethrower", the sixth track from Freeze-Frame, as the flip side to "Freeze-Frame". However, 7" vinyl releases in the UK alternated between "Flamethrower" and another song from the same album, the second track "Rage in the Cage". A limited edition Picture Disc of "Freeze-Frame" released in North America used "Centerfold" as the b-side.

References

1982 singles
EMI Records singles
The J. Geils Band songs
1981 songs
Song recordings produced by Seth Justman
Songs written by Seth Justman
Songs written by Peter Wolf